The Tapu River (Waipatukahu Stream prior to 1974) is a river of the Coromandel Peninsula in New Zealand's North Island. It flows west from the Coromandel Range, reaching the Firth of Thames at the settlement of Tapu, approximately halfway between Thames and Coromandel.

Except for ammoniacal nitrogen, water quality in the river is good, as it mainly drains native forest; only 5.1% of the catchment is farmed. The river runs over andesite and dacite. Fish in the river include long and shortfin eels (tuna), common bully (toitoi), redfin bully, torrentfish (panoko), smelt (pōrohe), īnanga, koura, trout and shrimp. To protect Tapu from flooding, the flow capacity of the river has been maximised. The native frogs, Leiopelma archeyi and Leiopelma hochstetteri, live near the valley.

The Tapu-Coroglen Road, opened in 1927, follows the river, passing the Rapaura Watergardens and the square kauri tree. Kauri was logged in the 1880s and 1950s. The SH25 bridge was built about 1937.

Gold was mined in the valley from 1868 at several mines and continued until at least the 1930s.

See also
List of rivers of New Zealand

References

Thames-Coromandel District
Rivers of Waikato
Rivers of New Zealand
Firth of Thames
Hauraki Gulf catchment